Nynningen ("The Hum") is a Swedish progressive rock group founded in Gothenburg in 1970. The group released five albums in the 1970s before breaking up in 1980, then three more after reuniting in 2016. After the implementation of the Sverigetopplistan in late 1975, the group had two charting albums: Antlingen en ny dag, which reached #27 in 1976, and Vi kommer att leva igen, which peaked at #24 in 1977.

Discography
Man mognar med åren (1972)
För full hals (1973)
1974 (1974) 
Äntligen en ny dag! (1975)
Vi kommer att leva igen (1977) (with Nationalteatern)
Vi kommer (2019)
Allting börjar klarna (2020)
Anakonda och andra låtar (2021)

References

Swedish progressive rock groups
Swedish rock music groups

sv:Nynningen